Massenburg Plantation, also known as Woodleaf Plantation, is a historic plantation house located near Louisburg, Franklin County, North Carolina.   The property encompasses 10 contributing buildings, 1 contributing site, and 1 contributing structure. The main house reached its present form in 1838, and is a simple two-story L-shaped dwelling, with a rear two-story wing.  It is four bays wide and features a stone block chimney.  The property also includes the contributing plantation office, smokehouse, cotton gin, storage building, hen house, -story Perry House bungalow (c. 1910), and Overseer's House ruins (c. 1832).

It was listed on the National Register of Historic Places in 1975, with a boundary increase in 2000. The property is currently owned by a descendant of the slaves.

References

Plantation houses in North Carolina
Houses on the National Register of Historic Places in North Carolina
Houses completed in 1838
Houses in Franklin County, North Carolina
National Register of Historic Places in Franklin County, North Carolina
Cotton plantations in the United States